James Da'One Brewer (born December 23, 1987) is a former American football offensive tackle. He was drafted by the New York Giants in the fourth round of the 2011 NFL Draft. He played college football at Indiana.

Professional career

New York Giants
He was drafted by the New York Giants in the fourth round of the 2011 NFL Draft with the 117th overall pick. Despite making the Giants 53-man roster out of training camp for the 2011 season, Brewer was a gameday inactive for all 16 regular season games.

New York Jets
Brewer signed a one-year contract with the New York Jets on March 19, 2015. He was waived on August 30, 2015.

References

External links
Indiana Hoosiers bio 

1987 births
Living people
American football offensive tackles
Indiana Hoosiers football players
New York Giants players
New York Jets players
Players of American football from Indianapolis